Holly Lawn, also known as the Richmond Council of Garden Clubs House, is a historic home located in Richmond, Virginia. It was built in 1901, and is a large -story, Queen Anne style buff-colored brick dwelling with an irregular plan and massing. It features a one-story, wrap-around porch; a two-story entrance tower topped by a pyramidal roof; and a hipped roof broken by gable-, hipped-, and conical roofed dormers with square casement windows. Holly Lawn was built for Andrew Bierne Blair, a prominent Richmond insurance agent.

It was listed on the National Register of Historic Places in 1982.

References

Houses on the National Register of Historic Places in Virginia
Queen Anne architecture in Virginia
Houses completed in 1901
Houses in Richmond, Virginia
National Register of Historic Places in Richmond, Virginia